Zelda Fichandler (née Diamond; September 18, 1924 – July 29, 2016) was an American stage producer, director and educator.

Life and career
Zelda Fichandler came from a family that emigrated from Russia when she was an infant. Her father, Harry Diamond, was a brilliant scientist who created the proximity fuse. Zelda started working in pursuing sciences until the day that she spilled hydrochloric acid down her shirt and burned herself; she decided to pursue acting instead.

At age 4, she moved from Boston area to Washington D.C. as her father accepted a job at the National Bureau of Standards. Aged 8, she performed as Helga in Helga and the White Peacock at the Rose Robison Cowen’s Studio for Children's Theatre.

Zelda Diamond's husband, Thomas C. Fichandler (August 9, 1915 – March 16, 1997), along with Edward Mangum, a professor of theater at George Washington University and Zelda's teacher, cofounded the Arena Stage theatre in 1950 in Washington. It was the city's first integrated theater, she hired actors and performers regardless of race or color. In the 1950s this was a huge statement as segregation was the norm.

The first location for the Arena was at the Hippodrome, at Ninth Street and New York Avenue NW in a tiny former art-film cinema. The first production the company staged, was Oliver Goldsmith’s eighteenth-century comedy, “She stoops to Conquer”. Her first play started out as simply a play for the sake and admiration for the arts, turned to more influential and statement making topics – such as racism – as they gained a reputation. A list of her earlier premiers that got her to that point include: She Stoops to Conquer (1950), The Great White Hope (1967), Indians (1969), Moonchildren (1971), Tintypes (1979).  As time passed, the company developed a dedicated audience and it quickly outgrew its initial space. As audiences grew, the theatre moved to "The Old Vat Theatre" which the company created in an abandoned distillery on the Potomac riverside. Then they eventually went to a larger theatre complex to get even more room in order to house the company. Harry Weese, FAIA and legendary designer of Washington, D.C.'s Metro System and stations designed the purpose built theater complex on Maine Avenue in 1961 and added to in 1972. Zelda Fichandler served as Arena's artistic director from the theatre's inception until her retirement at the end of the 1990–91 season.

During that time, Arena Stage became known as one of America's premier regional theatres. In 1961, she was able to direct Howard Sackler’s interracial drama “The Great White Hope,” which starred then-newcomers James Earl Jones and Jane Alexander. It was the first play to start as a regional theatre production, then transfer to Broadway. The Broadway performance won The Tony Award and the Best Pulitzer Prize for drama. The Arena Theatre Company in 1976 also won the Tony for Outstanding Regional Theatre. In 1973, the Arena became the first regional Theatre to be chosen by the US Department of state to perform in the Soviet Union. She showed her production of Inherit the Wind, a play beginning with a man who is thrown into jail for teaching evolution.

Fichandler directed numerous plays at Arena Stage including Death of a Salesman, Uncle Vanya, A Doll's House and Six Characters in Search of an Author. Several of her Arena Stage productions toured internationally, including Inherit the Wind and The Crucible.

From 1984 until 2009 Fichandler was chair of the graduate acting program and Master Teacher of Acting and Directing at the Tisch School of the Arts at New York University. From 1991–94, she was artistic director of The Acting Company. "Fichandler’s directing is characterized by intensive study and preparation. She all but psychoanalyzes 
the character she is studying and physically describes the emotions of the characters onstage with the utmost clarity. That is why she was so remarked for her ability to bring the actors to that level of excellence in her productions." [8]

Her honors and awards include the Common Wealth Award for distinguished service in the dramatic arts (1985); the Helen Hayes Award for directing The Crucible (1988); and the National Medal of Arts in 1996. She was inducted into the American Theatre Hall of Fame in 1999, the first artistic leader outside of New York to be so honored. In 2002, Zelda delivered The Americans for the Arts 15th Annual Nancy Hanks Lecture on Arts and Public Policy at the Kennedy Center. In 2009, she received the Foremother Award from the National Center for Health Research

Fichandler died in her home on July 29, 2016, in Washington, D.C., due to complications from congestive heart failure. She was 91 years old.

Quote 
"There is a hunger to see the human presence acted out. As long as that need remains, people will find a way to do theater."

References

Further reading

Bartow, Arthur. The Director's Voice : Twenty-One Interviews. New York : Theatre Communications Group. 2012. eBook.
Patricia Bauer. Zelda Fichandler. Encyclopædia Britannica. Encyclopædia Britannica, inc. September 30, 2016. https://www.britannica.com/biography/Zelda-Fichandler February 23, 2017
Various Authors. Zelda Fichandler, Valiant Striver in the Arena. American Theatre. August 6, 2016. http://www.americantheatre.org/2016/08/05/zelda-fichandler-valiant-striver-in-the-arena/

External links/sources 
 Zelda Fichander profile, NYU Tisch School of the Arts website; accessed June 16, 2014.
 "Zelda Fichandler Wins Drama Award", nytimes.com, December 1, 1985.
 Profile, washingtonpost.com; accessed July 26, 2015.
 Zelda Fichandler Papers

1924 births
2016 deaths
American theatre directors
American theatre managers and producers
United States National Medal of Arts recipients
Tisch School of the Arts faculty
People from Washington, D.C.
Cornell University alumni
Soviet emigrants to the United States
Women theatre directors
Women theatre managers and producers